Labeuvrière is a commune in the Pas-de-Calais department in the Hauts-de-France region of France.

Geography

Population

Places of interest
 The church of St. Christine, rebuilt, along with the rest of the village, after World War I.
 The ancient priory (fr: prévoté) of the abbey of St.Vaast, now the mairie.

See also
Communes of the Pas-de-Calais department

References

External links

 Official website of the commune

Communes of Pas-de-Calais